Gladstone Aerodrome  is located  south of Gladstone, Manitoba, Canada.

References

Registered aerodromes in Manitoba